The Taiwan coral-brotula (Brotulinella taiwanensis) is a species of viviparous brotula, the only known member of its genus, found mostly in the surge zone of the waters around Taiwan and the Philippines where it lives amongst rocks.  This species grows to a length of  SL.

References
 

Bythitidae
Monotypic fish genera
Fish described in 2005